The 1989–90 Bulgarian Hockey League season was the 38th season of the Bulgarian Hockey League, the top level of ice hockey in Bulgaria. Five teams participated in the league, and Levski-Spartak Sofia won the championship.

Regular season

Final 
 HK Slavia Sofia - Levski-Spartak Sofia 0:6/1:10

External links
 Season on hockeyarchives.info

Bulgarian Hockey League seasons
Bul
Bulg